Ion Echaide Sola (born 5 January 1988 in Pamplona, Navarre) is a Spanish professional footballer who plays for Andorran club UE Sant Julià as a defender.

Honours
Spain U19
UEFA European Under-19 Championship: 2007

External links

1988 births
Living people
Spanish footballers
Footballers from Pamplona
Association football defenders
La Liga players
Segunda División players
Segunda División B players
CA Osasuna B players
CA Osasuna players
SD Huesca footballers
Hércules CF players
CD Toledo players
Ontinyent CF players
CD Calahorra players
Haro Deportivo players
Primera Divisió players
UE Sant Julià players
Spain youth international footballers
Spain under-21 international footballers
Spanish expatriate footballers
Expatriate footballers in Andorra
Spanish expatriate sportspeople in Andorra